Bardehzi-ye Olya (also Romanized as Bardehzī-ye ‘Olyā; also known as Bardazī, Bardehzī, and Bardīzī) is a village in Beradust Rural District, Sumay-ye Beradust District, Urmia County, West Azerbaijan Province, Iran. At the 2006 census, its population was 352, in 59 families.

References 

Populated places in Urmia County